Tomoka (written: , , ,  or  in hiragana) is a feminine Japanese given name. Notable people with the name include:

, Japanese professional wrestler
, Japanese long-distance runner
, Japanese voice actress
, Japanese actress
, Japanese actress
, Japanese professional wrestler
, Japanese shogi player
, Japanese writer
, Japanese snowboarder

Fictional characters
, a character in the manga series Muteki Kanban Musume
, a character in the light novel series Ro-Kyu-Bu!
, a character in the manga series The Prince of Tennis
Tomoka Kase (加瀬 友香), a character in the manga series Kase-san.

Japanese feminine given names